The John Deere Model H tractor was a  row-crop tractor produced by John Deere from 1939 to 1947.

Description and production
The H was introduced in 1939 as a much-scaled-down version of the John Deere Model G. It was a general-purpose row-crop tractor, intended for smaller farms. As with most row-crop tractors, the spacing between the rear wheels could be adjusted to suit row spacings. The front wheels were offered with wide and narrow wheel arrangements, as well as high-crop and single front wheel versions. The tractor was equipped with a two-cylinder side-by-side  engine, of  displacement. A cost-saving peculiarity of the H was that the engine output was through the camshaft, rather than through the crankshaft. A three-speed transmission was provided. The H was produced only for kerosene fuel. Production ended in 1947. The Model M was an indirect follow-on product.

58,584 Model Hs were built at the John Deere factory in Waterloo, Iowa.

References

External links
 Test 312: John Deere H at the Nebraska Tractor Test Laboratory

John Deere tractors